On the Road to Kandahar: Travels through Conflict in the Islamic World is a 2007 nonfiction book written by Jason Burke, chief foreign correspondent of The Observer, based on his experiences living and traveling in various Islamic countries around the world. Much of the book is based in Afghanistan, Pakistan and Iraq.

See also
 Not for the Faint of Heart: Lessons in Courage, Power and Persistence
 The Pragmatic Entente: Israeli-Iranian Relations, 1948-1988

References

2007 non-fiction books
Books about international relations